Jane Pierson was a French film actress. She appeared in fifty five films between 1924 and 1952.

Selected filmography
 The Imaginary Voyage (1926)
 Captain Rascasse (1927)
 The Marriage of Mademoiselle Beulemans (1927)
 Little Devil May Care (1928)
 The Maelstrom of Paris (1928)
 The Wonderful Day (1929)
 Under the Roofs of Paris (1930)
 Everybody Wins (1930)
 Le Million (1931)
 You Will Be My Wife (1932)
 Youth (1933)
 La tête d'un homme (1933)
 Forty Little Mothers (1936)
 The Brighton Twins (1936)
 Fire in the Straw (1939)
 The Stairs Without End  (1943)

References

Bibliography
 Goble, Alan. The Complete Index to Literary Sources in Film. Walter de Gruyter, 1999.

External links

Year of birth unknown
Year of death unknown
French film actresses
French silent film actresses
20th-century French actresses